The 2007–08 National Division One was the 21st full season of rugby union within the second tier of the English league system, currently known as the RFU Championship. New teams included Northampton Saints (relegated from the Guinness Premiership 2006-07) and Esher and Launceston (both promoted from National Division Two 2006-07).  After two seasons Rotherham dropped the 'Earth' from their name to return to 'Rotherham Titans' (which they had been rebranded to in 2005 for the 2005-06 season) as sponsor Earth Mortgages ran into financial difficulties and Complete Technical Services instead became the club's new sponsor.

Following their relegation from the previous season, Northampton Saints won the National Division One title at the first attempt and returned to the Guinness Premiership for season 2008–09 with Chris Ashton setting what was then the English league try record of 39 tries in a season (although Phil Chesters broke this record with 70 tries in a season in tier 4, Ashton's still stands as the highest ever in tier 2). Exeter Chiefs finished in second place, and Pertemp Bees and Launceston were relegated to the 2008–09 National Division Two.

Participating teams 

Notes

Table

Results

Round 1

Round 2

Round 3

Round 4

Round 5

Round 6

Round 7

Round 8

Round 9

Round 10

Round 11

Round 12

Round 13

Round 14

Round 15 

Postponed. Game rescheduled to 4 March 2008.

Round 16 

Postponed. Game rescheduled to 15 March 2008.

Round 17 

Postponed. Game rescheduled to 23 February 2008.

Round 18

Round 19

Round 20 

Postponed. Game rescheduled to 11 April 2008.

Round 21

Round 22 

Postponed. Game rescheduled to 11 April 2008.

Round 23

Round 17 (rescheduled game)

Round 24

Round 15 (rescheduled game) 

Launceston had to play 'home game' at Franklin's Gardens due to issues with Polson Bridge floodlights

Round 25

Round 16 (rescheduled game)

Round 26

Round 27

Round 28

Round 20 & 22 (rescheduled games)

Round 29

Round 30

Total Season Attendances

Individual statistics 
Note that points scorers includes tries as well as conversions, penalties and drop goals.

Top points scorers

Top try scorers

Season records

Team
Largest home win — 93 pts 
96 - 3 Northampton Saints at home to Sedgley Park on 26 January 2008
Largest away win — 51 pts
59 - 8 Northampton Saints away to Sedgley Park on 6 October 2007
Most points scored — 93 pts
96 - 3 Northampton Saints at home to Sedgley Park on 26 January 2008
Most tries in a match — 14
Northampton Saints at home to Sedgley Park on 26 January 2008
Most conversions in a match — 13
Northampton Saints at home to Sedgley Park on 26 January 2008
Most penalties in a match — 6 
Cornish Pirates at home to Exeter Chiefs on 7 October 2007
Most drop goals in a match — 3
Exeter Chiefs away to Plymouth Albion on 8 September 2007

Player
Most points in a match — 36
 Bruce Reihana for Northampton Saints at home to Sedgley Park on 26 January 2008
Most tries in a match — 6
 Chris Ashton for Northampton Saints at home to Launceston on 26 April 2008
Most conversions in a match — 13
 Bruce Reihana for Northampton Saints at home to Sedgley Park on 26 January 2008
Most penalties in a match —  6 
 Gareth Steenson for Cornish Pirates at home to Exeter Chiefs on 7 October 2007
Most drop goals in a match — 3
 Danny Gray for Exeter Chiefs away to Plymouth Albion on 8 September 2007

Attendances

Highest — 13,498 
Northampton Saints at home to Exeter Chiefs on 22 March 2008
Lowest — 350 (x2)
Pertemps Bees (twice) at home to Plymouth Albion on 15 September 2007 & Esher on 10 November 2007
Highest Average Attendance — 11,494	
Northampton Saints
Lowest Average Attendance — 627
Sedgley Park

See also
 English rugby union system

References

N1
2007-08